Back to Black was a band formed in Minneapolis around 1970. They changed their name to The Family, a name later adopted by Prince for The Family. They were the house band at The Way community center, and performed at the Phyllis Wheatley Community Center (both now demolished). Prince considered them a lifelong influence. Their bassist, Sonny Thompson, worked with Prince in the New Power Generation from 1991 to 1996.

Notes

American funk musical groups